Broome is both a surname and a given name. Notable people with the name include:

Surname:
 Albert Broome (1900–1989), British soccer player
 Bob Broome, American football coach
 Christopher Edmund Broome (1812–1886), British mycologist
 David Broome (born 1940), British equestrian
 Ernest James Broome (1908–1975), Canadian politician
 Emilia Broomé (1866–1925), Swedish politician, feminist and peace activist
 Frank Broome (1915–1994), English footballer
 Sir Frederick Broome (1842–1896), Governor of Western Australia
 Harvey Broome (1902–1968), American lawyer, writer and conservationist
 Ian Broome (born 1960), English cricketer
 Jack Broome (1901–1985), Royal Navy officer
 James E. Broome (1808–1883), American politician
 Jerry Broome (born 1966), American actor
 John Broome (disambiguation), various people
 John L. Broome (1824–1898), United States Marine Corps officer
 John Broome (philosopher) (born 1947), British philosopher
 John Broome (writer) (1913–1999), comic book writer for DC Comics
 John "Jack" Spoor Broome (1917–2009), American aviator and philanthropist
 Johnny Broome (1818–1855), British boxer
 Lewis Broome (born 1991), Australian Rules footballer
 Mary Anne Broome, Lady Broome (1831–1911), New Zealand writer Mary Anne Barker
 Olivia Broome, British para powerlifter
 Paul Broome (born 1976), American soccer player
 Ralph Broome (pamphleteer) (1742–1805), English stockjobber and pamphleteer
 Ralph Broome (1889–1985), British Olympic bobsledder
 Sharon Weston Broome (born 1956), American politician
 William Broome (1689–1745), British poet and translator
 William Broome (1873–1942), New Zealand manufacturer/tailor, see Swanndri

Given name:
 Broome Pinniger (born 1902), Indian field hockey player